George Rodney, 3rd Baron Rodney (18 June 1782 – 21 June 1842), was a British peer.

Rodney was the eldest son of George Rodney, 2nd Baron Rodney, by Anne Harley, daughter and heiress of Thomas Harley. He succeeded his father in the barony in 1802, aged 19, inheriting Old Alresford House.

In 1804 he was appointed Lord-Lieutenant of Radnorshire (succeeding his grandfather Thomas Harley), a post he held until his death in 1842.

Lord Rodney married Charlotte Georgiana Gould-Morgan, daughter of Sir Charles Morgan, 2nd Baronet, in 1819. There were no children from the marriage. He died in June 1842, three days after his 60th birthday, and was buried at Old Alresford, Hampshire. His younger brother Thomas succeeded in the barony. Lady Rodney died in February 1878.

References

1782 births
1842 deaths
Lord-Lieutenants of Radnorshire
George 03